Submerged is a 2016 American survival thriller film directed by Steven C. Miller and starring Jonathan Bennett and Talulah Riley.

Premise
A young woman and her friends must battle the elements and a group of kidnappers in order to survive.

Cast
Jonathan Bennett as Matt
Talulah Riley as Jessie
Rosa Salazar as Amanda
Caleb Hunt as Brandon
Cody Christian as Dylan
Giles Matthey as Todd
Denzel Whitaker as Eddie
Willa Ford as Carla
Mario Van Peebles as Hector
Tim Daly as Hank

Reception
On review aggregator website Rotten Tomatoes, the film holds an approval rating of 25% based on 8 critics, with an average rating of 4.94/10. Jordan Hoffman of The Guardian gave the film two stars out of five.

References

External links
 
 

2016 films
2016 action thriller films
American action thriller films
Films directed by Steven C. Miller
2010s English-language films
2010s American films